Boros may refer to:

Boros (surname)
Boros (beetle), a genus of conifer bark beetles
Bodo people, an ethnic group in India
Boros Legion, a Magic: The Gathering faction from Ravnica
Lord Boros, a character from the series One Punch Man

See also
Boro (disambiguation)